Nürnberg-Rehhof station is a railway station in the city of Nuremberg, in Bavaria, Germany. It is located on the  Nuremberg–Schwandorf line of Deutsche Bahn. It is served by the S1 of the Nuremberg S-Bahn.

References

External links
 

Rehhof
Rehhof
Railway stations in Germany opened in 1987
1987 establishments in West Germany